The following is a partial list of Northwestern University faculty, including current, former, emeritus, and deceased faculty, and administrators at Northwestern University.

Presidents

Clark T. Hinman, DD (1853—54)
Henry S. Noyes, MA (1854—56) °
Randolph S. Foster, DD, LLD (1856—60)
Henry S. Noyes, MA (1860—67)°
David H. Wheeler, DD (1867—69)°
Erastus O. Haven, DD, LLD (1869—72)
Charles H. Fowler, DD, LLD (1872—76)
Oliver Marcy, LLD (1876—81)°
Joseph Cummings, DD, LLD (1881—90)
Oliver Marcy, LLD (1890)°
Henry Wade Rogers, LLD (1890—1900)
Daniel Bonbright, MA, LLD (1900—02)°
Edmund J. James, PhD, LLD (1902—04)
Thomas F. Holgate, PhD, LLD (1904—06)°
Abram W. Harris, ScD, LLD (1906—16)
Thomas F. Holgate, PhD, LLD (1916—19)°
Lynn H. Hough, DD (1919—20)
Walter Dill Scott, PhD, LLD (1920—39)
Franklyn Bliss Snyder, PhD, LLD (1939—49)
J. Roscoe Miller, MD, LLD, ScD (1949—70)
Robert H. Strotz, PhD, LLD (1970—84)
Arnold R. Weber, PhD (1984—94)
Henry S. Bienen, PhD (1995—2009)
Morton O. Schapiro, PhD (2009–present)

° - interim/acting president

Notable faculty

Robert R. McCormick School of Engineering and Applied Science

Jan D. Achenbach, professor emeritus of civil and environmental engineering, engineering sciences and applied mathematics, and mechanical engineering; National Medal of Science
Luis Amaral, professor of chemical engineering
Guillermo Ameer, professor of biomedical engineering, surgery
Vadim Backman, professor of biomedical engineering, medicine (hematology/oncology), biochemistry and molecular genetics
Ted Belytschko, professor of mechanical engineering, computational mechanics
Arthur Bronwell, professor of electrical engineering
Arthur Butz, associate professor of electrical engineering and Holocaust denier
Justine Cassell, professor of communication studies and electrical engineering and computer science
Stephen H. Davis, professor of engineering sciences and applied mathematics
Ken Forbus, computer science and artificial intelligence
Robert Fourer, professor of industrial engineering and management sciences, designer of AMPL
Mitra Hartmann, professor of mechanical engineering and biomedical engineering
Michael Honig, professor of electrical engineering and computer science
Chad Mirkin, professor of chemistry, materials science and engineering, chemical and biological engineering, biomedical engineering
Milan Mrksich, professor of biomedical engineering, chemistry, cell and molecular biology
Sandro Mussa-Ivaldi, professor of physiology, physical medicine and rehabilitation, biomedical engineering
Donald A. Norman, computer science and cognitive science
Monica Olvera de la Cruz, professor of materials science and engineering, chemistry, chemical and biological engineering, and by courtesy, physics and astronomy
Joseph Schofer, professor of civil and environmental engineering, director of the Infrastructure Technology Institute, and Associate Dean 
Samuel I. Stupp, Board of Trustees professor of materials science and engineering, chemistry, medicine, biomedical engineering
Allen Taflove, professor of electrical engineering
Ajit Tamhane, professor of Industrial Engineering and Management Sciences 
Teresa Woodruff, professor of biomedical engineering

Medill School of Journalism

Douglas Foster, former editor-in-chief of Mother Jones magazine
 John Lavine, dean
Jon Petrovich, former CNN and Sony Television executive, founder of CNN.com
Michele Weldon, author and former managing editor of Northshore magazine

School of Communication
 TJ Billard, assistant professor of communication studies and sociology, founding executive director of the Center for Applied Transgender Studies, and founding editor of the Bulletin of Applied Transgender Studies
Frank Galati, Tony Award-winning director and professor of performance studies
Dilip Gaonkar, rhetorical theorist
Rebecca Gilman, professor and playwright of Spinning into Butter
E. Patrick Johnson, professor of performance studies
Eric Patrick, professor of radio/television/film, experimental filmmaker, and 2006 Guggenheim Fellow
Madhu Reddy, professor 
Todd Rosenthal, Tony Award-winning scenic designer
Anna Shapiro, professor and director at the Steppenwolf Theatre
Lynn Spigel, scholar of television and American culture
Winifred Louise Ward, founded the field of Creative Drama
James G. Webster, professor and audience researcher
David Zarefsky, authority on rhetoric and forensics
Mary Zimmerman, Tony Award-winning director and professor of performance studies

School of Professional Studies
 Chris Abani, Nigerian author 
 Stuart Dybek, writer
 Reginald Gibbons, poet, fiction writer, translator, literary critic, artist
 Ed Roberson, poet

Judd A. and Marjorie Weinberg College of Arts and Sciences

J. Michael Bailey, professor of psychology
Myron L. Bender, professor of chemistry
Martha Biondi, professor of African American studies
T.H. Breen, historian of colonial America
Souleymane Bachir Diagne, professor of African and Islamic philosophy
Stuart Dybek, author of The Coast of Chicago and I Sailed With Magellan
Jesús Escobar, professor of art history 
Ward V. Evans, chemist and Oppenheimer security hearing panel member
Enectalí Figueroa-Feliciano, physicist
Gary Alan Fine, sociologist of culture
Benjamin Frommer, historian
Anupam Garg, physicist, author of Classical Electromagnetism in a Nutshell
Reginald Gibbons, professor of English and Classics, 2008 National Book Award nominee for poetry
Robert J. Gordon, economist
Samuel Goudsmit (1902–1978), Dutch-American physicist
Jürgen Habermas, contemporary philosopher
John Hagan, sociologist of crime and human rights
Leslie M. Harris, professor of African American studies
Erich Heller, essayist, philosopher, and literature scholar
Aleksandar Hemon, author of the National Book Award-nominated The Lazarus Project
Darlene Clark Hine, historian of African-American women
Brian M. Hoffman, (bio)chemist
Bonnie Honig, political theorist
Daniel Immerwahr, historian
Vicky Kalogera, astrophysicist, Director of CIERA
Richard Kieckhefer, professor of Religion, author of Magic in the Middle Ages and Theology in Stone
Mary Kinzie, professor of English and creative writing, author of A Poet's Guide to Poetry
Laura Kipnis, professor and author of bestselling Against Love
Alex Kotlowitz, author of There Are No Children Here and The Other Side of the River
Richard Kraut, philosopher
Carole LaBonne, professor and chair of Molecular Biosciences
Jennifer Lackey, professor of philosophy
Peter Ludlow, John Evans Professor in Moral and Intellectual Philosophy
Nancy MacLean, historian, author of Behind the Mask of Chivalry
Yuri Manin, mathematician
Charles Manski, economist and social policy analyst
Tobin J. Marks, professor of chemistry
Charles Mills, philosophy professor
Chad Mirkin, nanomedicine and chemistry
Joel Mokyr, historian of science and economics, author of The Lever of Riches
Richard I. Morimoto, Cell and Molecular Biology
Aldon Morris, sociologist and author of The Origins of the Civil Rights Movement
Gary Saul Morson, Russian literature, scholar of Tolstoy and Dostoevsky
Dale Mortensen, Nobel Prize Laureate in Economics 
Charles Moskos, military sociologist, former advisor to President Bill Clinton
Adilson E. Motter, physicist
Edward Muir, Renaissance historian
Barbara Newman, scholar of Medieval religion and female spirituality
Monica Olvera de la Cruz, professor of materials science and engineering and professor of chemistry
Robert Orsi, professor of American religious history
Ed Paschke, artist and Chicago Imagist
Mary Pattillo, urban sociologist, named one of Newsweeks "Women of the 21st Century"
John Pople, late Nobel Prize-winning chemistry professor
Janice Radway, professor of communications studies
Mark Ratner, professor of chemistry
Jennifer Richeson, professor of psychology and MacArthur Fellow
George C. Schatz, professor of chemistry
Heidi Schellman, professor of physics and department head at Oregon Stae University
Richard Bruce Silverman, professor of chemistry
Lynn Spigel, Frances Willard Professor of Screen Cultures, cultural history of television
James Fraser Stoddart, Board of Trustees Professor of Chemistry
Stuart Struever, anthropologist and archaeologist, former president of the Society for American Archaeology
Andrei Suslin, mathematician
Charles Taylor, philosopher, author of Sources of the Self
Fred W. Turek, Director of the Center for Sleep & Circadian Biology and the Charles & Emma Morrison Professor of Biology in the Department of Neurobiology
Mayda Velasco, physicist and Director of COFI
Samuel Weber, Avalon Professor of the Humanities, critical theory
Irwin Weil, scholar of Soviet history, music, and literature
Rudolph H. Weingartner, American philosopher and academic administrator, former dean of the college and later provost of the University of Pittsburgh
Garry Wills, Pulitzer Prize, winning historian and religious scholar
Eleanor Wilner, poet and editor
Barry Scott Wimpfheimer, scholar of judaism and Talmudic literature
Wendy Griswold, sociologist
Christopher Udry, economist

Feinberg School of Medicine

Guillermo Ameer, Professor of Surgery
Rinad Beidas, Chair and Ralph Seal Paffenbarger Professor of Medical Social Sciences
Robert Bonow, Max and Lilly Goldberg Distinguished Professor of Cardiology, Professor of Medicine (Cardiology)
Serdar Bulun, Chair and John J. Sciarra Professor of Obstetrics and Gynecology
William T. Bovie, Chair, Department of Biophysics 
Daniel Brat, Chair, Department of Pathology, Magerstadt Professor of Pathology
Sarah A. Connolly, Adjunct Assistant Professor of Microbiology-Immunology
Nathan Smith Davis, Jr., former Dean
David Gius, Associate Professor of Radiation Oncology and Pharmacology
Robert D. Goldman, Chair of the Department of Cell and Molecular Biology 
Eva Gottwein, Associate Professor of Microbiology-Immunology 
Jordan Graffman, Professor of Physical Medicine and Rehabilitation
Kathleen J. Green,Joseph L. Mayberry Professor of Pathology and Toxicology and Professor of Dermatology 
Maha H. Hussain, Genevieve E. Teuton Professor of Medicine and deputy director of the Lurie Comprehensive Cancer Center at Northwestern University
Ravi Kalhan, Professor of Preventive Medicine 
Kristen Knutson, Associate Professor of Neurology
Wyndham Lathem, former Associate Professor of Microbiology-Immunology
Donald Lloyd-Jones, Chair, Department of Preventive Medicine, Eileen M. Foell Professor, Professor of Preventive Medicine (Epidemiology), Medicine (Cardiology) and Pediatrics
Laszlo Lorand, professor emeritus in cell and molecular biology
Elizabeth M. McNally, Director of the Center for Genetic Medicine, Elizabeth J. Ward Professor of Genetic Medicine Professor of Medicine and Biochemistry and Molecular Genetics
Chad Mirkin, Director of the International Institute for Nanotechnology and the George B. Rathmann Professor of Chemistry and professor of Medicine
Michael E. Newcomb, Assistant professor and clinical psychologist
Anna Christina Nobre, Adjunct Professor of Neurology
Susan Quaggin, Charles Horace Mayo Professor of Medicine, Director of the Feinberg Cardiovascular Research Institute and chief of the Division of Nephrology
June K. Robinson, Research Professor of Dermatology
John A. Rogers, Professor of McCormick School of Engineering, Dermatology and Neurological Surgery
Karla Satchell, Professor of Microbiology-Immunology
Ali Shilatifard, Robert Francis Furchgott Professor and Chairman of the department of biochemistry and molecular genetics, and the director of the Simpson Query Institute for Epigenetics
Melissa Simon, George H. Gardner, MD professor of clinical gynecology, vice-chair of clinical research in the Department of Obstetrics and Gynecology, professor of preventive medicine and medical social sciences
Dinee Simpson, Assistant Professor of Surgery
Sara Solla, Professor of Neuroscience
D. James Surmeier, Nathan Smith Davis Professor and Chair in the Department of Neuroscience
Linda Suleiman, Assistant Dean of Medical Education and Director of Diversity and Inclusion
Robert L. Sufit, professor of neurology 
Clyde Yancy, Vice Dean for Diversity and Inclusion, Chief of Cardiology in the Department of Medicine, Magerstadt Professor, Professor of Medicine (Cardiology) and Medical Social Sciences
Phyllis Zee, the Benjamin and Virginia T. Boshes Professor in Neurology, the director of the Center for Circadian and Sleep Medicine (CCSM) and the chief of the Division of Sleep Medicine (neurology)

Kellogg School of Management

Donald Haider
Philip Kotler, author of Marketing Management, named #4 management guru of all time by Financial Times
Barry Nelson, system simulations
Stanley Reiter, economics, author of Designing Economic Mechanisms
Don E. Schultz, marketing and advertising
Dean Karlan, development economist
Brian Uzzi, Richard L. Thomas Professor of Leadership. He is best known for his work in the fields of sociology, network science, the science of science, and complex systems.

School of Law

Ronald J. Allen, the John Henry Wigmore Professor of Law
Andrew Koppelman, John Paul Stevens Professor of Law
Steven Lubet, Edna B. and Ednyfed H. Williams Memorial Professor
Dorothy Roberts, Kirkland & Ellis Professor of Law, author of Killing the Black Body

School of Music

David Bilger, Principal Trumpet, Philadelphia  Orchestra
Peter Martin, jazz pianist
David McGill, Retired Principal Bassoon, Chicago Symphony Orchestra
Sherrill Milnes, Retired Professor Emeritus of voice and opera
Michael Mulcahy, Second Trombone, Chicago Symphony Orchestra and senior lecturer of trombone
Ursula Oppens, pianist
Gene Pokorny, Principal Tuba, Chicago Symphony Orchestra
Thomas Rolfs, Principal Trumpet, Boston Symphony Orchestra
Michael Sachs, Principal Trumpet, Cleveland Orchestra
W. Stephen Smith, professor of voice and opera
Mallory Beth Thompson, Director of Bands and professor of wind conducting
Amnon Wolman, composer of electronic music
Gail Williams, brass department chair and professor of horn
Victor Yampolsky, Director of Orchestral Activities and professor of orchestral conducting
Jay Alan Yim, composer

Other
Ross Atkinson, librarian
Arthur Charles Lewis Brown, expert on Arthurian legend
Beth Combs, head women's basketball coach at Northwestern from 2004 to 2008
Lindsey Durlacher, wrestling coach
Robert Hess (1938-1994), President of Brooklyn College
Vladimir Ipatieff, Russian expert on catalysis whose laboratory at Northwest eventually led to the formation of the Center for Catalysis and Surface Science

References 

Northwestern University faculty
Northwestern University faculty